Evangelical Reformed Church may refer to:

Evangelical Reformed Church in Germany
Lithuanian Evangelical Reformed Church
Evangelical Reformed Baptist Churches in Italy
Evangelical Reformed Presbyterian Church
Evangelical Reformed Church in Sweden
Evangelical Reformed Church in Japan
Evangelical Reformed Church of Christ
Evangelical-Reformed Church in Poland
Evangelical Reformed Church in Angola
German Evangelical Reformed Church
National Union of Independent Reformed Evangelical Churches of France
Evangelical Reformed Church in Šidski Banovci
High German Evangelical Reformed Church
First Evangelical Reformed Church
Evangelical Reformed Churches in Brazil
Evangelical Reformed Churches in Poland
Evangelical Reformed Parish, Warsaw
Belarusian Evangelical Reformed Church
Evangelical Reformed Church of Colombia
Evangelical Reformed Church in Portugal
New Evangelical Reformed Church
Evangelical Reformed Church of Prussia
Evangelical Reformed Church in Transcarpathia
Evangelical Reformed Church (Westminster Confession)
Union of Evangelical Reformed Churches in Russia
Swiss Evangelical Reformed Church
Evangelical-Reformed Church of Appenzell
Evangelical Reformed Church of the Canton Basel-Landschaft
Evangelical-Reformed Church of the Canton Basel-Stadt
Evangelical Reformed Church of the Canton Freiburg
Evangelical Reformed Church of the Canton of Lucerne
Evangelical Reformed Church of the Canton of St. Gallen
Evangelical Reformed Church of the Canton of Schaffhausen
Evangelical-Reformed Church of Uri
Evangelical Reformed Church in Valais
Evangelical Reformed Church of the Canton of Vaud
Evangelical Reformed Church of the Canton of Zürich

See also
Evangelical Church (disambiguation)